The men's team free rifle was a shooting sports event held as part of the Shooting at the 1924 Summer Olympics programme. It was the fifth appearance of a rifle team event but the first with three different distances (400 m, 600 m, and 800 m). The competition was held on 26 and 27 June 1924 at the shooting ranges at Camp de Châlons, Mourmelon. 88 shooters competed for 18 nations.

Results
The scores of the five shooters on each team were summed to give a team score. No further shooting was done. The maximum score was 750. Hungary was allowed to compete with an incomplete team.

All American shooters finished in top ten position. An individual event would have been won by Morris Fisher followed up by Walter Stokes and the Swedish shooter Hugo Johansson. Sidney Hinds' perfect score of 50 came after he was accidentally shot in the foot during the competition, when a Belgian competitor next to him accidentally discharged his gun when arguing with an official.

References

External links
 Official Report
 

Shooting at the 1924 Summer Olympics